Lucas Lissens (born 25 July 2001) is a Belgian footballer who currently plays as a centre-back for Anderlecht in the Belgian First Division A.

External links

2001 births
Living people
Belgian footballers
Belgium youth international footballers
Belgium under-21 international footballers
Association football defenders
R.S.C. Anderlecht players
RSCA Futures players
Belgian Pro League players
Challenger Pro League players